Hoboken–33rd Street is a rapid transit service operated by the Port Authority Trans-Hudson (PATH). It is colored blue on the PATH service map and trains on this service display blue marker lights. This service operates from the Hoboken Terminal in Hoboken, New Jersey by way of the Uptown Hudson Tubes to 33rd Street in Midtown Manhattan, New York. The  trip takes 14 minutes to complete.

This service operates from 6 a.m. to 11 p.m. on weekdays only.  At other times, this service is replaced with the Journal Square-33rd Street (via Hoboken) service. This route has the fewest handicapped accessible stations available; they are at the terminals only.

History
The Hoboken-33rd Street service originated as the Hoboken–19th Street service operated by the Hudson and Manhattan Railroad (H&M) on February 26, 1908. The first of what would become the four lines of the H&M/PATH service, it operated from Hoboken Terminal and ran through the Uptown Hudson Tubes, but ran only as far north as 19th Street in Manhattan. An extension of the  H&M from 19th Street to 23rd Street opened on June 15, 1908. The line was expanded to 33rd Street on November 10, 1910, with an intermediate station at 28th Street.

The 28th Street station was closed in September 1939 during the construction of the IND Sixth Avenue Line in Manhattan, and the 19th Street station was closed on August 1, 1954. The H&M itself was succeeded by Port Authority Trans-Hudson (PATH) in 1962.

After the September 11 attacks destroyed the World Trade Center station, service on the Hoboken–33rd Street line was suspended during overnight hours, with all service provided by the Newark–33rd Street via Hoboken branch. When the Exchange Place station reopened in June 2003, the Newark–33rd Street via Hoboken branch was truncated to Journal Square, but operated during weekends as well. It was renamed the Journal Square–33rd Street (via Hoboken) branch.

The Hoboken station suffered severe damage from Hurricane Sandy, which devastated the PATH system in late October 2012. Due to the lengthy amount of time that was necessary to complete the repairs, service on the line was temporarily suspended. On December 19, 2012, the line resumed operations after the Hoboken station reopened.

Station listing

References

PATH (rail system) services
Railway services introduced in 1908